Lonnie Hannah II (born February 17, 1964) is an American former ice sledge hockey player. He won medals with Team USA at the 2002 Winter Paralympics and 2006 Winter Paralympics.

Life and career
As a child, Hannah was a roller skating champion.

At 20 years old, he was injured at work by a falling shelving unit which broke three vertebrae and paralyzed him from the waist down. He was diagnosed with melanoma in 2005.

He won three national wheelchair tennis championships (two doubles and a single). In 1996, he was named Player of the Year by the National Foundation of Wheelchair Tennis.

References

External links 
 

1964 births
Living people
American roller skaters
American sledge hockey players
Paralympic sledge hockey players of the United States
Paralympic gold medalists for the United States
Paralympic bronze medalists for the United States
Ice sledge hockey players at the 2002 Winter Paralympics
Ice sledge hockey players at the 2006 Winter Paralympics
Medalists at the 2002 Winter Paralympics
Medalists at the 2006 Winter Paralympics
Paralympic medalists in sledge hockey
Wheelchair tennis players